The 1998–99 Cupa României was the 61st edition of Romania's most prestigious football cup competition.

The title was won by FCSB against Rapid București.

Format
The competition is an annual knockout tournament.

First round proper matches are played on the ground of the lowest ranked team, then from the second round proper the matches are played on a neutral location.

If a match is drawn after 90 minutes, the game goes into extra time. If the match is still tied, the result is decided by penalty kicks.

In the quarter-finals and semi-finals, each tie is played as a two legs.

From the first edition, the teams from Divizia A entered in competition in sixteen finals, rule which remained till today.

First round proper

|colspan=3 style="background-color:#97DEFF;"|21 October 1998

|}

Second round proper

|colspan=3 style="background-color:#97DEFF;"|18 November 1998

|}

Quarter-finals 
The matches were played on 2 December and 9 December 1998.

||2–0||0–1
||1–1||1–2
||5–1||1–1
||0–1||0–2
|}

Semi-finals
The matches were played on 14 April and 5 May 1999.

||1–0||1–2
||1–2||1–3
|}

Final

References

External links
 romaniansoccer.ro
 Official site
 The Romanian Cup on the FRF's official site

Cupa României seasons
Cupa Romaniei
Romania